The Basilica Papale di San Lorenzo fuori le mura (Papal Basilica of Saint Lawrence outside the Walls) is a Roman Catholic papal minor basilica and parish church, located in Rome, Italy. The Basilica is one of the Seven Pilgrim Churches of Rome and one of the five "papal basilicas" (former "patriarchal basilicas"), each of which was assigned to the care of a Latin Church patriarchate. The Basilica was assigned to the Patriarchate of Jerusalem. The Basilica is the shrine of the tomb of its namesake, Saint Lawrence (sometimes spelt "Laurence"), one of the first seven deacons of Rome who was martyred in 258. Many other saints and Bl. Pope Pius IX are also buried at the Basilica, which is the centre of a large and ancient burial complex.

History 

Before the present-day Basilica was constructed, the former estate upon which it sits was once home to a small oratory built by Emperor Constantine I.  The Emperor built it over the site on which tradition held that St. Lawrence was buried in 258. The church was restored or rebuilt by Pope Damasus I, who had served there as a deacon.

In the 580s, Pope Pelagius II commissioned the construction of a church over the site in honour of the Saint.  In the 13th century, Pope Honorius III commissioned the construction of another church in front of the older one. Part of the nave and triumphal arch of Honorius's church were incorporated, although not perfectly aligned. 

It was adorned with frescos depicting the lives of Saint Lawrence and the first martyred deacon, St. Stephen, who is interred with St. Lawrence in the crypt, or confessio, under the high altar. Excavations have revealed several other crypts of various persons, buried below the contemporary street level. Pope St. Hilarius is also buried here.

The portico (c.1220) has Cosmatesque decoration by the Vassalletto family of craftsmen.
The 13th-century frescoes, which were reconstructed, depict scenes from the lives of St. Lawrence and St. Stephen, both being martyred, young deacons. There are two ancient sarcophagi in the portico: a Christian one, possibly decorated in the 7th century on an older sarcophagus, has a relief depicting putti (cherubs) picking grapes. While vines and grapes are symbols of the Holy Eucharist, these images are probably not symbols thereof. Further, two Romanesque stone lions were moved here from the old entrance.

The campanile was built in the 12th century. Immediately inside the entrance is the tomb of Guglielmo Cardinal Fieschi, who died in 1256, but was entombed in an ancient sarcophagus, itself being incidentally carved with a relief depicting a pagan marital feast.

In 1819, painter J. M. W. Turner visited San Lorenzo, where he made several sketches.

Interior
Inside, the choir enclosure and pulpit have Cosmatesque decoration, and there is also a fine Cosmatesque Paschal candlestick from the 12th or 13th century. The antique Ionic capital on the column directly behind the pulpit has carvings of a frog and a lizard. On the triumphal arch are Byzantine mosaics from the 6th century, depicting Christ with saints. The confessio below the high altar is entered from the nave. Here, St. Lawrence and St. Stephen are enshrined. The latter was transferred from Constantinople by Pope Pelagius II during his restoration of the Basilica. Behind the high altar is a Papal altar with an inscription of the names of the makers, namely the Cosmati family, and dating it to 1148.

In the chapel of San Tarcisio, at the end of the right nave, is a 1619 Beheading of the Baptist by Giovanni Serodine.  

The Basilica was home to the Latin Patriarch of Jerusalem from 1374 to 1847. A restoration was done in the mid-18th century by Virginio Vespignani.

Reconstruction
In 1943, the Basilica was bombed by American planes during the Second World War. Restoration continued until 1948, allowing some accretions from the 19th century to be removed. However, the frescoes on the facade were destroyed.

The brick facade was completely rebuilt after the bombings.  

The Basilica adjoins a major cemetery and therefore holds a large number of funerals.

Burials 

 Deacon of Rome and martyr St. Lawrence
 Deacon of Jerusalem and first martyr St. Stephen
 Pope St. Hilarius
 Bl. Pope Pius IX
 Italian Prime Minister Alcide De Gasperi, a founding father of the European Union (near the entrance in a tomb sculpted by Giacomo Manzù)
 Pope Pius XII's parents (Filippo (d. 1916) & Virginia (née Graziosi) Pacelli (d. 1920)); their remains were blasted off during an Allied bombing raid in 1943, re-interred in a single crypt after the War
 Pope Zosimus

References

Bibliography 
 Mondini, Daniela, S. Lorenzo fuori le mura, in: P. C. Claussan, D. Mondini, D. Senekovic, Die Kirchen der Stadt Rom im Mittelalter 1050-1300, Band 3 (G-L), Stuttgart 2010, pp. 317–527, 
 
 Muñoz, A. La Basilica di S.Lorenzo fuori le mura. Roma 1944.
 Da Bra, G. S.Lorenzo fuori le mura. Roma 1952

External links
High-resolution 360° Panoramas and Images of San Lorenzo fuori le Mura | Art Atlas

Lorenzo fuori le mura, San
580s establishments
6th-century churches
Burial places of popes
Rome Q. VI Tiburtino